Beecher Community School District is a public school district in Genesee County in the U.S. state of Michigan and in the Genesee Intermediate School District. It serves the census-designated place of Beecher which is just north of Flint.

Notable events
The district gained national attention on February 29, 2000, when six-year-old Kayla Rolland was shot and killed by a classmate at Buell Elementary School.

Athletics
Beecher's mascot is the Beecher Buccaneer.

Notable graduates

 Carl Banks, linebacker for the New York Giants, Washington Redskins, and Cleveland Browns 
 Duane D. Hackney, the most decorated enlisted person in history of the U.S. Air Force
 Courtney Hawkins, wide receiver for Tampa Bay Buccaneers, and Pittsburgh Steelers
 Roy Marble, former Iowa Hawkeyes and NBA player
 Monté Morris, point guard for the Denver Nuggets of the NBA, former standout point guard for Iowa State Cyclones, former Mr. Basketball Michigan, winner of 3 Class C MHSAA State Championships

References

External links
 

School districts in Michigan
Education in Genesee County, Michigan